Tomáš Reichental (Tomi) is a Holocaust survivor. He was born in Czechoslovakia in 1935 to Jewish farmers and lived with his family on their farm until he was the age of eight. At this age laws started coming in that prohibited the movement and rights of Jewish people and that is when he and his family went into hiding. He, his mother, his brother, and his grandmother were caught and taken to Bergen-Belsen concentration camp in 1944 where they remained until the camp was liberated by the British in 1945. More than 30 members of his family were killed during the Holocaust.

He moved to Ireland in 1959 but did not speak about his experiences for half a century.

Reichental is known for his talks about his experience of The Holocaust as a child.  he is one of three Holocaust survivors residing in Ireland. He gives talks in secondary schools, colleges and at events across the country. His aim is to educate people about what happened during the Holocaust so that we can remember the people who died in it and so it never happens again: "After all the horror, I am doing my best to keep the memory of those lost ones alive. We—you, me, your children, my children—must never forget."

In 2007 Reichental was approached by Gerry Gregg, Seamus Deasy, and Oliver Donohoe about making a film about him and his experiences in Bergen-Belsen. He agreed and in late 2007 they traveled to Germany to film Reichental talking about his experiences in the concentration camp, while standing where it once stood.

In the documentary Close to Evil Reichental tried to interview former SS guard Hilde Michnia, but she declined to meet him, though she appeared in the documentary. This led to Hans-Jürgen Brennecke, a Hamburg prosecutor, filing charges against her as she was suspected of forcing prisoners on an evacuation march in which 1400 women died. Reichental wanted to meet her and hoped that she had atoned, but his disappointment was that she was stuck in the 1940s and had denied the murder of inmates in Bergen-Belsen.

In 2011, Reichental's book I Was a Boy in Belsen was published by O'Brien Press Ltd. In this autobiography, Reichental recounts his experiences as a child prisoner in the Bergen-Belsen camp.

Reichental has received many awards for his efforts to promote tolerance and to educate young people about the importance of remembrance and reconciliation and it has made him one of the most inspirational figures in modern Ireland. In 2015, Trinity College Dublin awarded him an honorary doctorate. He was conferred an honorary doctorate by Dublin City University in March 2016, citing his recent advocacy:

In 2019 the Bar Council of Ireland awarded Tomi a Human Rights Award in recognition of his work promoting tolerance, remembrance and reconciliation. He is one of the last two Holocaust survivors living in Ireland.

References

1935 births
20th-century Irish people
21st-century Irish people
Living people
Czechoslovak emigrants to Ireland
Recipients of the Order of Merit of the Federal Republic of Germany
Bergen-Belsen concentration camp survivors